Vance-Tousey House is a historic home located at Lawrenceburg, Dearborn County, Indiana.  It was built about 1818, and is a two-story, five bay, Late Georgian / Federal style brick and sandstone dwelling with a low hipped roof. The main block is flanked by -story wings.  Flanking the main entrance are fluted Doric order engaged columns above which is a Palladian window.  It was built by Samuel C. Vance, founder of the town of Lawrenceburg.  It houses the Dearborn County Historical Society.

It was added to the National Register of Historic Places in 2000.

References

External links

Dearborn County Historical Society website

Houses on the National Register of Historic Places in Indiana
Georgian architecture in Indiana
Federal architecture in Indiana
Houses completed in 1818
Houses in Dearborn County, Indiana
National Register of Historic Places in Dearborn County, Indiana
1818 establishments in Indiana